Dame Anne Helen Richards  (born 1964) is the chief executive officer of Fidelity International. 

Previously, she served as chief investment officer of Aberdeen Asset Management and chief executive officer of M&G Investments.

Early career
Scottish-born, she was educated at the Royal High School, Edinburgh.  Richards began her career with a research fellowship at CERN, after graduating from the University of Edinburgh with a First-Class Honours degree in Electronics and Electrical Engineering.      She subsequently worked for Cambridge Consultants, before pursuing further studies in France at INSEAD graduating as MBA.

City career
Richards worked initially as an analyst with Alliance Capital, before moving to JP Morgan, working in portfolio management, and then moving on to Mercury Asset Management, and later MLIM. In 2002 she took up the post of Chief Investment Officer and Joint Managing Director of Edinburgh Fund Managers plc. When EFM was taken over by Aberdeen Asset Management in 2003, Richards continued in her role as Chief Investment Officer.

It was announced in February 2016 that she would be taking over from Michael McLintock as chief executive of M&G Investments from June 2016.
In July 2018, it was announced that she would leave M&G Investments, following the merger to become M&G Prudential (and subsequent demerger from Prudential UK), to join Fidelity International as chief executive officer.

In 2021, Richards led development of a range of flexible working options at Fidelity International, following the COVID-19 lockdown.

Non-executive positions
Richards was Vice-Convener of the Court of the University of Edinburgh and is a former director of both the Esure Group plc and the Scottish Chamber Orchestra.

She is a member of the US-based Board of Leaders of 2020 Women on Boards, which works to increasing the proportion of women on corporate boards.

Richards chaired the CERN and Society Foundation Board from 2015 to at least 2019.

Fellowships and honours
Dame Anne is a Chartered Engineer (CEng) and a Fellow of the Chartered Institute for Securities and Investment (FCSI), and in March 2016 she was elected a Fellow of the Royal Society of Edinburgh (FRSE), Scotland's national academy for science and letters.

Appointed Commander of the Royal Victorian Order (CVO) in 2014, Commander of the Order of the British Empire (CBE) in 2015, she was promoted to Dame Commander of the Order of the British Empire (DBE) in the 2021 Birthday Honours for "services to financial services, women, education and science".

References

1964 births
Living people
Alumni of the University of Edinburgh
INSEAD alumni
Electronics engineers
Women chief executives
Chief investment officers
Prudential plc
Commanders of the Royal Victorian Order
Dames Commander of the Order of the British Empire